Gerald McLaughlin (May 11, 1893 – December 6, 1977) was a United States circuit judge of the United States Court of Appeals for the Third Circuit.

Education and career

Born in Newark, New Jersey, McLaughlin received an Artium Baccalaureus degree from Fordham University in 1914, and a Bachelor of Laws from Fordham University School of Law in 1917. He served in the United States Army during World War I and thereafter was in private practice in Newark from 1919 to 1943.

Federal judicial service

McLaughlin was nominated by President Franklin D. Roosevelt on May 24, 1943, to a seat on the United States Court of Appeals for the Third Circuit vacated by Judge William Clark. He was confirmed by the United States Senate on June 8, 1943, and received his commission on June 14, 1943. He assumed senior status on July 15, 1968, serving in that status until his death on December 6, 1977.

References

Sources
 

1893 births
1977 deaths
Lawyers from Newark, New Jersey
Judges of the United States Court of Appeals for the Third Circuit
United States court of appeals judges appointed by Franklin D. Roosevelt
20th-century American judges
United States Army personnel of World War I
Fordham University alumni
Fordham University School of Law alumni